Kunwar Manvendra Singh  is a Bharatiya Janata Party politician with three-term Member of Legislative Council and one term Member of Legislative Assembly from Uttar Pradesh. Former designated Chairman of Laghu Jal Vidyut Nigam government of Uttar Pradesh during Sri Kalyan Singh Ji as Chief Minister, and former appointed Chairman 
of Bundelkhand Vikas Board during the present tenure of Sri Yogi Adityanath as Chief minister.

He has been associated with Sangh and Vidyarthi Parishad since his early days.

He was elected to the legislative assembly of the Uttar Pradesh once in the elections held in 1985, and three times as member of Legislative Council.

He was elected to the Madhya Pradesh Legislative Assembly in 2013.

On January 21, 2021, he was elected unopposed with 11 other candidates to the Uttar Pradesh Legislative Council, he had previously been the acting chairman of the council from May 2002 to August 2004.

References

http://upgovernor.gov.in/en/pressrelease

Living people
1951 births